Baylisascaris schroederi is a species of roundworm in the family Ascarididae. It occurs in China and is a parasite of giant pandas. Many wild giant pandas are infected with this parasite.

References

Parasitic nematodes of animals
Ascaridida